Two Daughters of Eve is a 1912 American silent drama film directed by  D. W. Griffith.

Cast
 Claire McDowell - The Mother
 Henry B. Walthall - The Father
 Florence Geneva - The Actress
 Gertrude Bambrick - Backstage
 Elmer Booth - Backstage
 Kathleen Butler - Backstage
 W. Christy Cabanne - The Driver
 Harry Carey - In Audience
 Dorothy Gish - Theater crowd extra
 Lillian Gish - Theater crowd extra
 Mary Gish - Theater crowd extra
 D. W. Griffith - At Stage Door
 Robert Harron - At Stage Door
 Harry Hyde - In Audience
 Marion Kerby
 Mae Marsh
 Walter Miller - Backstage
 W. Chrystie Miller
 Antonio Moreno - An Actor/At Stage Door
 George Nichols
 Alfred Paget - In Audience
 W. C. Robinson - Backstage

See also
 Harry Carey filmography
 D. W. Griffith filmography
 Lillian Gish filmography

References

External links

1912 films
Films directed by D. W. Griffith
American silent short films
American black-and-white films
1912 drama films
1912 short films
Silent American drama films
1910s American films